Done in the Open was a verse collection published by in 1903 American author Owen Wister. The book was a collaboration with the artist Frederic Remington, the verses being written to accompany Remington's drawings.

Notes

1903 poetry books
American poetry collections